Ivanovo Polje   is a village in Croatia. It is connected by the D26 highway.

Populated places in Bjelovar-Bilogora County